Vrata is a commune located in Mehedinți County, Oltenia, Romania. It is composed of a single village, Vrata. This was part of Gârla Mare Commune until 2004, when it was split off.

References

Communes in Mehedinți County
Localities in Oltenia